Roy Emerson and Neale Fraser were the defending champions, but lost in the semifinals to Boro Jovanović and Nikola Pilić.

Bob Hewitt and Fred Stolle defeated Jovanović and Pilić in the final, 6–2, 5–7, 6–2, 6–4 to win the gentlemen's doubles tennis title at the 1962 Wimbledon Championship.

Seeds

  Roy Emerson /  Neale Fraser (semifinals)
  Bob Hewitt /  Fred Stolle (champions)
  John Fraser /  Rod Laver (semifinals)
  Chuck McKinley /  Dennis Ralston (quarterfinals)

Draw

Finals

Top half

Section 1

Section 2

Bottom half

Section 3

Section 4

References

External links

Men's Doubles
Wimbledon Championship by year – Men's doubles